Dinhata is a city and a municipality in Cooch Behar district in the state of West Bengal, India. It is the headquarters of the Dinhata subdivision. Dinhata is known for arranging best Durga Puja in North Bengal. 
Dinhata is famous for Sastho Mela & Dinhata Utsav, Sanghati Mela, Janmastami Mela.

Geography

Location
It has an average elevation of 36 metres (118 feet).

According to the District Census Handbook 2011, Koch Bihar, Dinhata covered an area of 4.55 km2.

Area overview
The map alongside shows the eastern part of the district. In Tufanganj subdivision 6.97% of the population lives in the urban areas and 93.02% lives in the rural areas. In Dinhata subdivision 5.98% of the population lives in the urban areas and 94.02% lives in the urban areas. The entire district forms the flat alluvial flood plains of mighty rivers.

Note: The map alongside presents some of the notable locations in the subdivisions. All places marked in the map are linked in the larger full screen map.

Demographics
As per 2011 Census of India Dinhata had a total population of 36,124 of which 18,344 (51%) were males and 17,780 (49%) were females. Population in the age range 0–6 years was 2,485. The total number of literate persons in Dinhata was 30,487 (91.61% of the population over 6 years).

For information regarding language and religion see Dinhata I#Language and religion and Dinhata II#Language and religion

 India census, Dinhata had a population of 34,303. Males constitute 51% of the population and females 49%. Dinhata has an average literacy rate of 80%, higher than the national average of 59.5%: male literacy is 84% and, female literacy is 75%. In Dinhata, 9% of the population is under 6 years of age.

Civic administration

Police station
Dinhata police station has jurisdiction over Dinhata municipal area and Dinhata I CD block.

CD block HQ
The headquarters of the Dinhata I CD block are located at Dinhata town.

Municipality
The total number of wards in the municipality are 16.

Education
Dinhata College was established in 1956. Affiliated with the Cooch Behar Panchanan Barma University, it offers courses in arts, science and commerce.

A regional station of the Central Tobacco Research Institute, India is located in this town.

Healthcare
Dinhata Subdivisional Hospital at Dinhata functions with 180 beds.

Transport
Dinhata Railway Station serves the city of Dinhata, the station lies under Alipurduar railway division of Northeast Frontier Railway.

Notable people
 GM Quader, former Bangladeshi commerce minister
 Hossain Mohammad Ershad, former President of Bangladesh
 Hossain Mokbul Shahriar, Bangladeshi politician
 Merina Rahman, Bangladeshi MP
 Mozammel Hossain Lalu, Bangladeshi politician
 Saad Ershad, Bangladeshi businessman
 Kamal Guha, former Agriculture Minister of the Government of West Bengal
 Dipak Sen Gupta, Freedom fighter and one of the leading participants of Goa Freedom Movement from West Bengal in 1955, former Member of West Bengal Legislative Assembly for 4 consecutive terms and Chairman of Dinhata Municipality
 Udayan Guha, MLA from Dinhata constituency in West Bengal Legislative Assembly

Dinhata picture gallery

References

Cities and towns in Cooch Behar district
Cities in West Bengal

See also

Harish Chandra Paul